The 1918 college football season was a season of college football in the United States. There was no consensus champion, with the Official NCAA Division I Football Records Book listing Michigan and Pittsburgh as national champions.

World War I's impact on colleges in the country, and the Spanish flu pandemic of 1918 eliminated most of that year's scheduled college football games. However, to boost morale of the troops, many military organizations fielded teams to play against collegiate programs.  This is exemplified no more strongly than in a letter published in the Spalding Guide from US president Woodrow Wilson:

A huge military offensive was planned by the Allied countries in the spring of 1919, so all able-bodied men of ages 18 to 20 were scheduled to be drafted in the fall of 1918. As an alternative, the men were offered the option of enlisting in the Student Army Training Corps, known as SATC, which would give them a chance to pursue (or continue pursuing) their educations at the same time as they participated in a 12-week war-training session. This was essentially an alternative to boot camp. The colleges were paid by the government to train the future soldiers, which enabled many of them to avoid closure. The program began on October 1, 1918. Most of the students who were potential football players were under the auspices of the War Department's SATC program.

In an early September meeting between college and War Department officials in Plattsburg, Missouri it became clear that the training regimen envisioned for the soldiers could be incompatible with participation in intercollegiate athletics. On September 13, 1918 newspapers around the country reported that the War Department had asked colleges to reexamine their football schedules. In August and September, athletics backers successfully argued that athletics training was an important part of military training, and the season was back on.

The influenza outbreak was colloquially called Spanish flu. Most flu outbreaks disproportionately kill juvenile, elderly, or already weakened patients, but the 1918 pandemic predominantly killed previously healthy young adults. To maintain morale, wartime censors minimized early reports of illness and mortality in Germany, the United Kingdom, France, and the United States. Papers were free to report the epidemic's effects in neutral Spain (such as the grave illness of King Alfonso XIII). This created a false impression of Spain as especially hard hit, thereby giving rise to the pandemic's nickname, "Spanish Flu". By the end of the pandemic, between three and five percent of the world population had died as a result, making it one of the deadliest natural disasters in human history.

Conference and program changes

Season summary 
Perhaps the highest profile game was a highly publicized War Charities benefit staged at Forbes Field in Pittsburgh in front of many of the nation's top sports writers, including Walter Camp. The game pitted John Heisman's undefeated, unscored upon, and defending national champion Georgia Tech Yellow Jackets against "Pop" Warner's Pittsburgh Panthers who were sitting on a 30-game win streak. Pitt defeated Georgia Tech 32–0.

Rose Bowl 
The Rose Bowl, then the only bowl game, pitted the Mare Island Marines of California and the Great Lakes Navy from Illinois. It was a celebration of victory following the end of fighting in World War I on November 11, 1918. Great Lakes Navy defeat Mare Island, 17–7.

Conference standings

Major conference standings

Independents

Minor conferences

Minor conference standings

Awards and honors

All-Americans

The consensus All-America team included:

Statistical leaders
Receptions leader: Bernard Kirk, Notre Dame, 7

References